Little Grand Rapids Airport  is the airport serving the First Nations communities of Little Grand Rapids and the nearby Pauingassi First Nation, Manitoba, Canada. These two communities are connected to the more populated southern areas of Manitoba by a winter road which is only operational for about two months per year. During the other 10 months, this airport is the only practical way move passengers and goods in and out of the communities. The lack of roads and small size of aircraft, typically Otters, Grand Caravans or similar, makes it relatively busy compared to the population of roughly 1,500 served by the airport.

This airport in Manitoba is operated by the Manitoba Transportation & Government Services - Northern Airports & Marine Operations.

Its NDB beacon is 280 - 4B.

Airlines and destinations

References

External links
Government of Manitoba Northern Airports list

Certified airports in Manitoba